Louisa Hawkins Canby (December 25, 1818 – 1889) was nicknamed the "Angel of Santa Fe" in 1862 for her compassion toward sick, wounded, and freezing Confederate soldiers at Santa Fe, New Mexico. Mrs. Canby was the wife of Union Brig. Gen. Edward Richard Sprigg Canby whose order to destroy or hide not only weapons and ammunition but all food, equipment, and blankets prior to any retreat was largely responsible for the Confederates' misery. Taking pity on her husband's enemies, Mrs. Canby not only organized other officers' wives to nurse the sick and wounded among the occupying Confederate forces, but also showed Col. William Read Scurry where fleeing Union forces had hidden blankets and food. Mrs. Canby, said one rebel, "captured more hearts of Confederate soldier [sic] than the old general ever captured Confederate bodies."

Early life of a military wife
Louisa Hawkins was born December 25, 1818, at Paris, Kentucky, to John and Elizabeth (Waller) Hawkins. Relatives and close friends usually called her "Lou." Like the family of Louisa's future husband, the Hawkinses moved from Kentucky to Indiana. After graduating from Georgetown Female College in Georgetown, Kentucky, Louisa married Lt. E.R.S. Canby at Crawfordsville, Indiana on August 1, 1839. The Hawkins family apparently had a strong attraction to the military. Louisa's younger brother, John Parker Hawkins, was a West Point graduate, served during the Civil War, and retired a brigadier general in 1894. At least two of Louisa's three sisters also married military officers (who happened to be brothers).

A Methodist, Louisa was very religious but also ecumenical: she once helped a Protestant marry a Catholic in spite of the controversy stirred up by the union. At her husband's funeral service in Portland, Oregon, she arranged to have clergymen representing three Protestant denominations share in the service. (A fourth clergyman, feeling less ecumenical, bowed out.) At the final funeral service in Indianapolis, Indiana, a Baptist and a Methodist shared duties.

During E.R.S. Canby's military career, Louisa joined him on assignments with the almost sole exception of the Mexican–American War. In his memoirs, William Tecumseh Sherman recalls the arrival of the Canbys at Monterey, California, in early 1849 where then-Major Canby succeeded Sherman as adjutant-general of the military Department of California. The Canbys, with their six-year-old daughter, Mary (who died in childhood), took up residence in Monterey which was then the military headquarters for California. (Benicia, California was soon added as the headquarters for the Pacific.) About this time, Louisa met Lt. Col. Henry Stanton Burton, who became involved in controversy when he proposed marriage to Maria Amparo Ruiz, the granddaughter of the former Mexican governor of Baja California. (She was a remarkable woman in her own right: widely admired for her beauty and aristocratic carriage, she later became a successful novelist.) The announcement of their engagement set off a firestorm as the Roman Catholic Bishop of California condemned the union (Burton was a Protestant), and the governor declared that "all the authorities of California are not to authorize any marriage when either of the parties is a Catholic." Louisa offered the couple the use of the Canby home where their marriage took place on July 7, 1849. Major Canby, who had begun a tour of northern California on July 2 and did not return to Monterey until August 9, was forced to explain that he had taken no part in the affaire and that his wife, a civilian, had acted alone.

During the two years the Canbys were in the territory, California applied for statehood. Both Canbys contributed to this effort unofficially, Mrs. Canby by copying documents for the statehood convention and Major Canby by arranging and partially indexing territorial records.

Almost a decade later, in 1859, while Colonel Canby was commander of Fort Bridger, Utah Territory (now in the state of Wyoming), the Canbys spent an enjoyable Christmas with Captain Henry Hopkins Sibley a charming but volatile Louisianan who had graduated from West Point a year ahead of Canby. It is not certain whether Louisa had met Sibley previously although many rumors ranging from the outlandish (that Louisa was Sibley's sister) to the plausible (that her husband could have been best man at Sibley's 1840 wedding) would circulate on the Union side during 1862. Canby and Sibley certainly had crossed paths previously: Canby served on a court-martial panel that exonerated Sibley in 1858, and he subsequently endorsed Sibley's invention, the Sibley tent, which would be widely used during the Civil War. (The two men could have known each other earlier since both were at West Point and served in Florida and Mexico at about the same times, but it is uncertain whether they knew each other before the late 1850s.)

Civil War nurse behind enemy lines

When in January 1862 the newly minted Brig. Gen. Sibley led a Confederate brigade into New Mexico Territory and began marching up the Rio Grande toward Colorado, Colonel Canby (subsequently promoted to brigadier general in March of that year) was in charge of the defense of the entire territory, which included what is today the states of Arizona and New Mexico as well as the southern tip of Nevada. He assigned to himself the command of Fort Craig, which, at that point, was the southernmost fort in the Confederates' line of march that had not yet been captured. While her husband fought Sibley in the pitched Battle of Valverde, Louisa awaited the outcome of the campaign at Santa Fe, the territorial capital. On March 2, the Confederates captured Albuquerque and eight days later took Santa Fe. The Federal army and territorial government had evacuated the capital, burning or hiding any supplies they were unable to carry with them to Fort Union, which was northeast of Santa Fe.

Louisa, along with the wives and families of other Union officers chose to remain behind. They soon had misgivings, not for fear of the approaching rebel army so much as because the evacuation of territorial authorities had encouraged looters and other criminal elements. The Confederates who entered Santa Fe on March 10, 1862, were thus surprised to find a welcoming committee consisting of the wives of Union officers led by the wife of Colonel Canby. As expected, the Confederates established martial law and then conducted a mostly fruitlessly search for hidden supplies. On March 29, 1862, Confederate forces returned to Santa Fe from a Pyrrhic victory at Glorieta Pass. On their way to attack Fort Union, the Confederates had met a force made up predominantly of inexperienced Colorado volunteers. While the Confederates had won a technical victory, a unit of about 500 Coloradans had gone behind Confederate lines and destroyed more than 70 wagons loaded with Confederate food and gear. Without sufficient provisions to lay siege to Fort Union, the rebels had no alternative but to retreat.

It was late winter and snow still fell in the region. Without even enough blankets to keep their sick and wounded warm, the bedraggled Confederates who returned to Santa Fe must have made a pitiable sight. Louisa went to visit their wounded and was so moved by their suffering that she revealed hidden stores of blankets and turned her home into a field hospital; she personally led a hastily organized company of nurses to care for the sick and dying men and made trips to outlying encampments to bring her patients into Santa Fe or, failing that, to treat in situ those soldiers who could not be brought into the city. It was not until April 1 or 2 that General Sibley, who had been at Albuquerque most of this time, arrived at Santa Fe and personally met with Louisa. It is not known what transpired between them, but it can be presumed that he thanked her for caring for his men and reminisced about their earlier encounters when he and her husband had been on the same side.

Controversy
Historians are surprisingly mum about whether or not there were any negative consequences for Louisa Canby's actions, especially because these could have been interpreted as giving aid and comfort to the enemy. Her husband's biographer, Max Heyman, says that the Santa Fe Gazette described her actions as "praiseworthy," but the same paper declared that Colonel Canby had "given more general satisfaction than any other Department Commander" and "we have seen nothing to condemn" in his record. Just as the Gazette'''s favorable view of Canby did not mean that he was universally praised, so the paper's assessment of Mrs. Canby's actions may not have been shared by all. In understanding what consequences did occur, it is necessary to examine the context of her behavior. In comparison to other campaigns of the Civil War, and especially in light of the ill-treatment of prisoners of war at Andersonville by the Confederates and at Camp Douglas by the Federals, the conduct of the New Mexico Campaign was generally chivalrous. Truces were honored after each of the campaign's two major battles and prisoners of war were usually freed or "paroled" after brief captivity. General Canby personally set a high standard. After interviewing several former P.O.W.s, Confederate Sgt. Albert Peticolas concluded that all who had fallen into Canby's hands had been well treated. In this context, Louisa's compassion can be seen as consistent with her husband's policies.

Others in the territory, including Governor Henry Connolly, were not satisfied with General Canby's strategy of minimal engagement combined with drawing the Confederates further and further from their sources of support in southernmost New Mexico and Texas. The governor and others wanted to see more pitched battles with the invaders. The battle at Glorietta would never have taken place had Col. John Slough followed Canby's order to remain inside Fort Union. No doubt, Slough had gone forth with the blessing of the governor; yet, although the ultimate outcome of the battle favored the Union, Slough resigned his commission before Canby had the opportunity to demand it. (Though another interpretation is that he resigned in protest because Canby ordered him not to pursue the rebels.) Subsequently, Canby nearly engaged the retreating Confederates in a battle near Peralta, New Mexico, but halted preliminary skirmishing when a sandstorm arose. While Canby's decision was probably prudent in view of the bad weather and the fact that the Confederates were already defeated, many of his critics began to make up stories such as that Canby and Sibley "had an understanding" not to engage each other and that Louisa Canby was either Sibley's sister or Mrs. Sibley's cousin. (Mrs. Sibley was Charlotte Kendall, a New Yorker whose father was from Massachusetts and mother was from New York; there is no evidence that she and Louisa were related.) Many of these stories were seriously entertained by later historians, although Martin Hall and Heyman were among the first to realize that there was no basis for these rumors. In this context, it seems likely that Louisa's kindness toward the Confederate wounded played into the whispering campaign or even provided the germ of the rumor that the Kentucky-born officer's wife was actually the Louisiana general's sister; however, no one seems to have recorded any explicit charges against her, either officially or unofficially. This may have been because Louisa had her defenders (as evidenced by the April 26, 1862, article in the influential Gazette), but, finally, the fact of the Confederates' ultimate retreat from the territory rendered the issue moot.

General's wife

Soon after the defeat of the Confederates in New Mexico, General and Mrs. Canby were reassigned back East where Canby spent more than a year in bureaucratic service in Pennsylvania, New York, and Washington, D.C. sometimes as an unofficial administrative assistant to Secretary of War Edwin M. Stanton. It was not until 1864 that Canby was allowed out from behind a desk, and he and Mrs. Canby were sent to the Trans-Mississippi region, eventually finding a home in New Orleans where Louisa stayed while her husband supported the Union's impending defeat of Confederate forces, which happened to include the remnants of Sibley's brigade; although, by this time, Sibley himself had been court-martialed for dereliction of duty during the Battle of Bisland. (Relieved of his command, he had gone to Richmond, Virginia.)

Shortly before his forty-seventh birthday, General Canby was shot by a sniper while on an inspection tour up the Mississippi and White rivers. His wound was a painful but "through-and-through" gunshot to the pelvis. He arrived home the day after his birthday, and Louisa immediately put him to bed and nursed him back to health during the next month.

Following the war, General Canby was retained by the army as one of only ten brigadier generals and served as military commander of various districts throughout the South. In an 1873 newspaper article, Mrs. Lew Wallace (née Susan Arnold Elston) would recall that Louisa practiced charity, tending to give things away to the needy wherever she went in the South, endearing herself to the local populace, but at some cost to her household. "I can hardly keep anything, there is so much suffering about us," Louisa wrote Wallace from New Orleans. She sometimes pleaded the case of someone in need to her husband if she thought he might help. Mrs. Wallace also said that Louisa was far more sociable than her husband and that she, rather than he, would arranged for any gatherings at the Canby residence.

The Canbys next moved to Portland, Oregon where the general became commander of the Department of Columbia. This Pacific Northwest command encompassed Oregon, Washington, and Alaska. In 1872 the Modoc War broke out, involving both Oregon and northern California. On April 11, 1873, Modoc leader Kintpuash (also known as Captain Jack) killed the unarmed Canby and several members of his party during peace talks. Canby had written frankly to Louisa about his misapprehensions over the negotiations with the Modocs. A chief concern (which proved to be prophetic) was that Captain Jack so feared treachery that he might be capable of committing treachery preemptively. On the day of his death Canby received a letter from his wife in Portland. She had written, "I think over all sorts of Modoc treachery till I am becoming a nervous, hysterical woman and will have to get away from Oregon to get over it." Louisa found her husband's death so unbearable that she spent a week in bed. His body was shuttled from place to place for more than a month before it reached Indianapolis, Indiana, and was finally buried at Crown Hill Cemetery. With the support of her brother, Colonel John Hawkins, Louisa devoted the last sixteen years of her life to promoting the memory of her husband.

Death and remembrance

The people of Portland, Oregon, upon learning the size of the pension that a general's widow could expect ($30 a month, which was increased to $50 by a special act of Congress a year later), raised and presented to her $5,000. Although this was meant as a gift, Mrs. Canby treated it as an interest-free loan, instead. She supplemented her income with the interest from the $5,000 but willed that the principal be returned to the people of Portland upon her death.

Louisa Hawkins Canby was buried beside her husband June 27, 1889. Nearly four years later, R. O. Fairs, a Confederate veteran organizing a reunion of the Sibley Brigade, wrote to the War Department asking for help in locating Louisa Canby. Not realizing that she was deceased, Fairs explained: "I wish to show her we still entertain kind remembrance and esteem for her, by inviting her to our reunion."

References

Books
 Don Alberts, ed. Rebels on the Rio Grande: The Civil War Journals of Albert Peticolas. Albuquerque: University of New Mexico Press, 1984.
 Donald S. Frazier. Blood and Treasure: Confederate Empire in the Southwest. College Station, Texas: Texas A&M University Press, 1995.
 Martin H. Hall. Sibley's New Mexico Campaign. Austin: University of Texas Press, 1960.
 Max L. Heyman, Jr. Prudent Soldier: A Biography of Major General ERS Canby, 1817-1873, Frontier Military Series III. Glendale, CA: The Arthur H. Clark Co., 1959.
 Robert L. Kirby. The Confederate Invasion of New Mexico and Arizona 1861-1862 [Westernlore Great West and Indian Series XIII].  Tucson: Westernlore Press, 1981 [second printing; first printing 1958].
 Jerry Thompson. Henry Hopkins Sibley: Confederate General of the West. Natchitoches, Louisiana: Northwestern State University, 1987.

Books online
 William T. Sherman. Memoirs of William T. Sherman, Vol. I, Part 1 https://web.archive.org/web/20060628065121/http://civilwartalk.com/cwt_alt/resources/e-texts/mem_sherman/03.htm
 The Road to Glorietta Readers Companion: Edward Richard Sprigg Canby, [additional information not included in The Road to Glorietta: A Confederate Army Marches Through New Mexico by Donald W. Healy] https://web.archive.org/web/20041209122419/http://darkwing.uoregon.edu/~donh/page12.html (and following to /page20.html)

Journals online
 Journal of San Diego History'' (Summer 1984, Volume 30, Number 3), "María Amparo Ruiz Burton: The General's Lady" by Kathleen Crawford. http://www.sandiegohistory.org/journal/84summer/burton.htm

Catalogues online
 Filson Historical Society Library: MS #118. "Canby, Edward Richard Sprigg, 1819[sic]-1873. Papers, 1837-1873." A\C214. .33 cu. ft. Miscellaneous papers, 1844, 1862. C\C. 2 items." https://web.archive.org/web/20060816065719/http://www.filsonhistorical.org/guide2.html [The papers in this collection were consulted in writing this articles.]

External links

1818 births
1889 deaths
People from Paris, Kentucky
People of New Mexico in the American Civil War
Burials at Crown Hill Cemetery
American Civil War nurses
American women nurses